Geoffrey Pitcher (born 15 August 1975) is an English former professional footballer who played as a midfielder.

Career
Born in Sutton, Berkshire, Pitcher played in The Football League for Millwall (although he made no league first team appearances), Watford, Colchester United and Brighton alongside a host of non-league clubs.

Honours

Club
Millwall
 FA Youth Cup Runner-up (1): 1993–94

Kingstonian
 FA Trophy Winner (2): 1998–99, 1999–2000
 Conference League Cup Runner-up (1): 1999–2000
 Conference Shield Winner (1): 1999–2000
 Conference Shield Runner-up (1): 2000–2001

References

External links
 
 Geoff Pitcher at Colchester United Archive Database

1975 births
Living people
English footballers
Association football midfielders
Millwall F.C. players
Watford F.C. players
Colchester United F.C. players
Brighton & Hove Albion F.C. players
Kingstonian F.C. players
Havant & Waterlooville F.C. players
Woking F.C. players
Dagenham & Redbridge F.C. players
Farnborough F.C. players
Barnet F.C. players
Stevenage F.C. players